Along with a concerted effort to commission new works for brass quintet since 1967 the bulk of any brass quintet's repertoire consists of arrangements of pre-existing music. Victor Ewald's four brass quintets are the first serious attempts at establishing a repertoire for the ensemble, though they do not stand up to typical string quartet repertoire of the same and preceding eras. The Chicago and New York Brass Quintets made sustained efforts to commission new works, and much of the original repertoire for brass quintet from the mid-20th century derives from their groundbreaking work. In the 1960s the mantle of creating a repertoire for brass quintet was taken up by the American Brass Quintet and the New York Brass Quintet, with both groups essentially establishing the brass quintet as a part of the chamber music field. Notably, only two brass quintets have ever been awarded the Walter W. Naumburg Chamber Music Award, considered by many to be the highest achievement in brass chamber music: The Empire Brass Quintet in 1976 and The Saturday Brass Quintet in 1990. But it was Canadian Brass  that developed the pragmatic approach to repertoire allowed the ensemble to reach a wider audience.  They developed a two prong approach to performance, developing a masterpiece approach to repertoire that popularized the brass quintet as an ensemble into what was essentially a "pops" ensemble.  Meanwhile, the ensemble has been pursuing an aggressive 45-year commissioning schedule.  Though this ensemble is seldom recognized for its achievement in the contemporary sphere, they have created well over 100 newly composed works for brass quintet, though few of the Canadian Brass commissions of original compositions have taken hold in the repertoire of other brass quintets.

It is generally agreed amongst brass players that the tuba is the dominant choice for brass quintets, with the ability to play smaller instruments such as bass trombone or baritone for certain repertoire such as Renaissance.  The American Brass Quintet has always used bass trombone instead of tuba, and their extensive commissioning has validated use of this instrumentation. It is not uncommon for composers to write interchangeable parts for tuba and bass trombone to enable both types of quintets to perform their work.

Brass quintet repertoire

Bruce Adolphe, Triskelion
Albert Ahlstrom, Treelight
Efraín Amaya Brass Quintet
Gilbert Amy, Relais
Malcolm Arnold, Quintet for Brass, Op. 73
Alexander Arutiunian, Armenian Scenes
Daniel Asia, Brass Quintet
Milton Babbitt, Counterparts
Jan Bach, Laudes
Jan Bach, Rounds and Dances
Jan Bach, Triptych
Jason Bahr, Divergence
Jason Bahr, Eagle Fanfare
Drew Baker, Kiln for brass quintet & piano
Leonardo Balada, Mosaics
Stephen Barber, Multiples Points on View of a Fanfare
Stephen Barber, Gone Is the River
Spiros Mazis, Brass Quintet No 1
Edward Barnes, Variations for Brass Quintet
Samuel Baron, Impressions of a Parade
Robert Beaser, Brass Quintet
Irwin Bazelon, Brass Quintet
Luciano Berio, Call
Derek Bourgeois, Sonata for Brass Quintet
Henry Brant, The Fourth Millennium
Robert Russell Bennett, Arabesque
Lauren Bernofsky, "The Duxbury Fanfare"
Lauren Bernofsky, "Fanfare"
Lauren Bernofsky, "Musica Solaris"
Lauren Bernofsky, Passacaglia
Lauren Bernofsky, Suite for Brass Quintet
Leonard Bernstein, Dance Suite for Brass Quintet
Larry Bitensky, For Then and Now for brass quintet
William Bolcom, Quintet
Darijan Božič, Kriki (The Cries)
Eugène Bozza, Bis
Eugène Bozza, Sonatine for 2 C trumpets, 1 horn, 1 trombone, and 1 tuba.
Alvin Brehm, Quintet for Brass
Timothy Broege, Brass Quintet No. 2
Howard J. Buss, Concord, Chromatic Fantasy, Sonic Fables (brass quintet & one percussion), Sonata K.380/Scarlatti,D., Tribute to Stephen Foster
Morley Calvert, An Occasional Suite
Morley Calvert, Suite from the Monteregian Hills
Elliott Carter, Brass Quintet
Elliott Carter, A Fantasy about Purcell's "Fantasia upon One Note"
Robert Chastain, Quintet for Brass Instruments
John Cheetham, Brass Menagerie
John Cheetham, Scherzo
Christopher Coletti, Bach's Bells
Jack Cooper, Scenes for Brass
Louis Coyner, Eolith No. 4 for brass quintet
Georges Delerue, Vitrail
Carl Della Peruti, Sounding for Brass Quintet
Robert Dennis, Blackbird Variations
Anthony DiLorenzo, Fire Dance
Kathleen Ditmer, Tonqueues
Lucia Dlugoszewski, Angels of the Inmost Heaven
Jacob Druckman, Other Voices
Jack Curtis Dubowsky, Brass Quintet No. 1
Jack Curtis Dubowsky, Due North
Amy Dunker, Convocation Fanfare
Jack End, 3 Salutations
Donald Erb, Three Pieces for Brass Quintet
Donald Erb, The St. Valentine's Day Brass Quintet
Alvin Etler, Quintet
Alvin Etler, Sonic Sequence
Victor Ewald, Quintet no. 1 in B-flat minor (Op. 5)
Victor Ewald, Quintet no. 2 in E-flat major (Op. 6)'
Victor Ewald, Quintet no. 3 in D flat major (Op. 7)
Victor Ewald, Quintet no. 4 in A-flat major (Op. 8)
Eric Ewazen, Colchester Fantasy
Eric Ewazen, Frost Fire
Eric Ewazen, Western Fanfare
Brian Felder, Canzone XXXI
Brian Fennelly, Brass Quintet No. 3 (Velvet and Spice)
Brian Fennelly, Locking Horns-Brass Quintet No. 2
Brian Fennelly, Prelude And Elegy For Brass Quintet
Myron Fink, A Suite of Antiques
Jason Forsythe, Sanctity
Malcolm Forsyth, Golyardes' Grounde
Lukas Foss, Night Music for John Lennon In Memory of December 8, 1980, for brass quintet and orchestra
Sean Friar, Kindly Reply for brass quintet (2016)
Kenneth Fuchs, Fire, Ice, and Summer Bronze
Jack Gallagher, Toccata for Brass Quintet
Jack Gallagher, Celebration and Reflection
Elliot Goldenthal, Brass Quintet No. 2
Daniel Grabois, Zen Monkey
Edward Gregson, Quintet for Brass
Yalil Guerra, Carnaval for brass quintet
Edmund Haines, Toccata
John Halle, Softshoe
Piers Hellawell, Sound Carvings from the Bell Foundry
Howard Hersh, "Tag!"
Anders Hillborg, Brass Quintet
Edward Hirschman, Four Bridges
Alun Hoddinott, Ritornelli 2
 Vagn Holmboe, Quintet No 1, Op. 79
 Vagn Holmboe, Quintet No 2, Op. 136
Eres Holz, Vier Schatten
Joseph Horovitz, Music Hall Suite
Eric Hudes, Pentaptych
John Huggler, Quintet
Jason Huffman, Christmas Tree
Karel Husa, Divertimento for brass quintet
Karel Husa, Landscapes
Stephen Jablonsky, Streets of Laredo (2018)
Stephen Jablonsky, Danny Boy (2019)
Stephen Jablonsky, Memorial Day (2019)
Edward Jacobs, Passed Time
David A. Jaffe, Descent into Flatland
Phillip Johnston, Sleeping Beauty
Collier Jones, Four Movements for Five Brass
Michael Kamen, Quintet
Jan Koetsier, Brass Quintet, Opus 65
Sonny Kompanek, Killer Tango
Peter Korn, Prelude and Scherzo
Pablo Kunik, "Locura" Opus 11 for Brass Quintet (2022)
Kyle Lane, Sonata for Brass Quintet
Michel Leclerc, Par monts et par vaux
Tania León, Saoko
Edwin London, Brass Quintet
Raymond Luedeke, Brass Quintet – Complexities and Contradictions
Witold Lutoslawski, Fanfare for CUBE
Witold Lutoslawski, Mini Overture
Frederik Magle, Intermezzo for Brass Quintet
Frederik Magle, Lys på din vej (Light on your path) for brass quintet and organ
David Maslanka, Arise!
Grace-Evangeline Mason, As Bronze 
Ludwig Maurer, Four Songs for Brass
Ludwig Maurer, Twelve Little Pieces for Brass Quintet
Francis McBeth, Four Frescos
Kevin McKee, Escape
Kevin McKee, Vuelta del Fuego
John Melby, 91 Plus 5 for brass quintet and computer
Jerome Moross, Sonatina for Brass Quintet
Robert Nagel, This Old Man March
Lior Navok, Gitz & Spitz Suite
Clint Needham, Abstract Mosaics
Per Nørgård, Vision
Leroy Osmon, "Introduction and Allegro"
Hermeto Pascoal, Timbrando
Robert Paterson, Dash
Robert Paterson, Shine 
Vincent Persichetti, Parable for Brass Quintet
Tom Pierson, Brass Quintet
Anthony Plog, 4 Sketches for Brass Quintet (Quintet #1)
Anthony Plog, Mini-Suite for Brass Quintet
Anthony Plog, Mosaics for Brass Quintet (Quintet No. 2)
Anthony Plog, Animal Ditties VII for Brass Quintet
Andre Previn, Four Outings for Brass
Howard Quilling, Four Pieces for Five Brass
Belinda Reynolds, Weave
Verne Reynolds, Suite
Peter Robles, Transcendent Tones, Fractured Forms
Ned Rorem, Diversions
Steven Christopher Sacco, Quintet for Brass
David Sampson, Distant Voices
David Sampson, Entrance
David Sampson, Morning Music
David Sampson, Strata (originally Quintet 99)
Peter Schickele, Hornsmoke: a horse opera
Adam Schoenberg, Reflecting Light
William Schmidt, Variations on a Negro Folksong
William Schuman, American Hymn: variations on an original melody'
Elliott Schwartz, Three Movements
Ralph Shapey, Brass Quintet
Ralph Shapey, Fanfares
Alexander Shchetynsky, On the Eve
Faye-Ellen Silverman, Kalends
Faye-Ellen Silverman, Quantum Quintet
Reynold Simpson, Brass Quintet
David Snow, Dance Movements
Juan María Solare, Heroes of a Forgotten Kingdom
Juan María Solare, Handwritten Runes
Juan María Solare, Affirmation
Juan María Solare, Hymn to Commitment
Andrew Sorg, Mental Disorders
Andrew Sorg, Voices In Da Fan
Andrew Sorg, Prelude and Fugue in E minor 
Andrew Sorg, Existential Crisis
Robert Starer, Evanescence
Raymond Stewart, OK Chorale
William Susman, The Heavens Above
Elias Tannenbaum, Patterns and Improvisations for BQ and Tape
Elias Tannenbaum, Structures
Michael Tilson Thomas, Street Song
Virgil Thomson, Family Portrait
Bramwell Tovey, Manhattan Music, for brass quintet and orchestra or wind ensemble
Bramwell Tovey, Santa Barbara Sonata
George Tsontakis, Brass Quintet
George Tsontakis, Hansel
Joseph Turrin, Fanfare for Five for brass quintet
Joseph Turrin, Soundscapes for brass quintet
Joseph Turrin, Solarium for brass quartet and piano
Joseph Turrin, Sketches for brass quintet
Vladimir Ussachevsky, Anniversary Variations
Vladimir Ussachevsky, Dialogues and Contrasts for Brass Quintet and Tape
Davide Verotta, 4 Movements for Brass
George Walker, Music for Brass (Sacred and Profane) 
Dan Welcher, Brass Quintet
Charles Whittenberg, Triptych
Alec Wilder, Jazz Suite for brass quintet
Natalie Williams, Land of Ages: fanfare for brass quintet.
Charles Wuorinen, Brass Quintet
Norman Yamada, Mundane Dissatisfactions
Carolyn Yarnell, Slade
John Zorn, Pulcinella
Ramon Zupko, Masques for brass quintet and piano

References

Further reading
 O'Loughlin, Niall. "Modern Brass", The Musical Times, Vol. 123, No. 1678, 250 Years of Covent Garden (Dec., 1982), p. 851

External links
 American Brass Quintet Database
 Brass Quintet Discography

 
Classical music lists